Ulfketil was the third bishop of the Diocese of Aarhus, from 1102 to 1134. He participated in the Battle of Fotevik on the side of king Niels of Denmark. Ulfketil died during the battle along with 4 other Danish bishops.

References

12th-century Roman Catholic bishops in Denmark
People from Aarhus
Year of birth unknown
Year of death unknown